The 2010 Vuelta a Castilla y León was the 25th running of the Vuelta a Castilla y León road cycling stage race, which started on 14 April and concluded on 18 April 2010. Normally the race would be run in March, however, this year the start was pushed back to mid-April. The race was won by Alberto Contador.

Stages

Final standings

References

External links
 

2010
2010 in Spanish road cycling